"Devil Inside" is a song by Australian rock band INXS. The song was written by Andrew Farriss and Michael Hutchence and was released as the second single (third in the UK) from the band's sixth studio album, Kick, in February 1988. The song reached number two on the US Billboard Hot 100 chart for two weeks. "Devil Inside" also peaked at number six in Australia, number three in Canada, and number two in New Zealand. Cash Box said that the band "[uses] a Daytripper-like guitar sound and riff it under a sultry, breathy vocal to put the point across."

Track listings
7-inch single
 "Devil Inside" (7-inch version (5:11) or single version (3:55))
 "On the Rocks" (3:05)

12-inch maxi
 "Devil Inside" (remix version) (6:36)
 "Devil Inside" (7-inch version (5:11) or single version (3:55))
 "On the Rocks" (3:05)

CD
 "Devil Inside" (remix version) (6:36)
 "Devil Inside" (7-inch version) (5:11)
 "On the Rocks" (3:05)

Charts

Weekly charts

Year-end charts

References

INXS songs
1988 singles
APRA Award winners
Songs written by Andrew Farriss
Songs written by Michael Hutchence
Atlantic Records singles
1987 songs
Song recordings produced by Chris Thomas (record producer)